Due Drop is the debut studio album by South African singer Toya Delazy. It was released by SME Africa on 23 April 2012. The album is a fusion of JEHP, an acronym for Jazz, Electro, Hip hop, and Pop. Production for the standard edition of the album was primarily handled by Jax Panik. The Johannesburg-based production duo Octave Couplet also assisted with production. The deluxe edition of the album includes addition production and remixes from Justin Denobrega, Pascal & Pearce, and Classy Menace.

The album's standard edition features The Soil and its deluxe edition features Ross Jack. Due Drop was preceded by the release of two singles: "Pump It On" and "Love Is In the Air". The artwork for all three installments of the album was conceptualized and created by photographer Ross Garrett.

Due Drop received generally mixed reviews from music critics, who commended its production, sound and commercial appeal. The album sold over 20,000 copies and was awarded a Gold plaque by the Recording Industry of South Africa. The deluxe edition of the album won Best Pop Album at the 2013 South African Music Awards, and was nominated in two categories at the 2013 Metro FM Music Awards. Delazy won Newcomer of the Year at the aforementioned SAMAs, and received a total of two nominations at the aforementioned Metro FM Music Awards for her work on the album.

Composition
The song "Love Is In the Air" has elements of house groove beats. "Are You Gonna Stay?" is a mid tempo song; Delazy's vocals on the song is reminiscent of Nicki Minaj. "Jai Lover" is an electro pop song  with Zulu lyrics. "Yeah Hell Yeah (With You)" is an ode to her sexual instincts. Delazy meditated and thought in silence on the broken hearted ballad "Love Takes Time". "Memoriam" is an electro anthem centered around the loss of love and life.

Singles
"Pump It On" was released as the album's lead single on 28 October 2011. The song was produced by Jax Van Heerden and Johnny Deridder. It received substantial airplay on 5FM and Metro FM. The music video for the song was released on November 15, 2011.

On 2 April 2012, SME Africa released "Love Is In the Air" as the album's second single. Its music video was uploaded onto Vevo on 26 March 2012. Classy Menace's remix of the song appeared on the deluxe edition of the album. The album's third single "Are You Gonna Stay" was released simultaneously with its video on 27 July 2012.

"Heart" was released as the fourth single from the album. The Pascal & Pearce-produced remix of the song appeared on the album's deluxe edition. The music video for "Heart" was directed by Jeana Theron of Velocity Films and aided by the non-profit organization Great Heart. The video was shot in three days; a full hour was spent shooting 12 frames.

On 30 September 2013, Delazy released the album's fifth single "Memoriam". The song was written in honor of one of her teachers who died in 2009. It explores themes of agony and despair, as well as the acceptance and curing that comes with time. Delazy stated that writing the song alleviated some of her psychological and emotional trauma. Channel 24 included the song on their list of the 15 of the best SA songs of 2013. The music video for "Memoriam" was shot and directed in Gauteng by Fausto Becatti.

Critical reception

Due Drop received mixed reviews from music critics. Georgina Marques of Channel 24 (a subsidiary of News24) gave the album 3 stars out 5, calling it "unashamedly pop" and saying "Toya's Jazz background and classical training allow most of the songs to transcend the superficial genre offering a more layered and interesting sound." Genevieve Vieira for Indie Does It said the album is "altogether satisfactory" and further stated that Delazy "has everything it takes, from the style, to the voice, flair and talent".

Nyeleti Machovani of Radio Biz extensively said, "the album is poppy, electro, and very much a dance-album; the lyrics do not offer much depth. The auto-tune is dominant, and this is a distraction to an artist who otherwise, has more to show." Molebogeng Maunatlala of GoXtra News said the album is accommodating because it "satisfies all the music lovers, and goes from Jazz, soul, hip hop to house". Lebohang Nthongoa of The Times said it is "catchy and has a vibe all its own". You Magazine gave the album a 4 out of 5 rating.

Accolades
The deluxe edition of the album won Best Pop Album at the 2013 South African Music Awards, and was nominated in two categories at the 2013 Metro FM Music Awards. Delazy's work on the album earned her the Newcomer of the Year category at the aforementioned SAMAs. Moreover, Jax Panik won the Best Producer category for his work on the deluxe edition. Delazy received a total of two nominations at the aforementioned Metro FM Music Awards for her work on the album.

Track listing

Personnel

Latoya Buthelezi – primary artist, composer
Jax Panik – producer 
Octave Couplet – producer
Justin Denobrega – producer
Classy Menace – producer
Pascal & Pearce – producer
Ross Jack – featured artist
The Soil – featured artist

Release history

References

2012 debut albums